Alberto Rodríguez Martín (born 31 December 1992), sometimes known as just Alberto, is a Spanish footballer who plays as a central defender for CD Lugo.

Club career
Born in Las Palmas, Canary Islands, Alberto played as a youth for CD Santidad Banot, Universidad de Las Palmas CF and Arucas CF, and made his senior debut with the latter in the 2011–12 campaign in the Primera Regional. He helped the club to achieve two promotions before signing for Tercera División side Villarrubia CF in August 2016.

In June 2017, Alberto returned to his native region after joining UD Tamaraceite in the Regional Preferente. He achieved promotion to the fourth tier in his first season, and was also a regular starter as his side promoted to the Segunda División B for the first time ever in 2020.

On 9 July 2021, Alberto went on a trial at Segunda División side CD Lugo. Late in the month, he signed a one-year contract with the club. He made his club debut on 2 December, starting in a 2–2 draw at AD Unión Adarve in the season's Copa del Rey, as his side won 4–3 on penalties.

Alberto made his professional debut on 5 December 2021 at the age of 28, coming on as a second-half substitute for Carlos Pita in a 0–0 home draw against UD Ibiza. He scored his first professional goal the following 19 March, netting the opener in a 1–1 home draw against Real Oviedo.

References

External links

1992 births
Living people
Footballers from Las Palmas
Spanish footballers
Association football defenders
Segunda División players
Segunda División B players
Tercera División players
Divisiones Regionales de Fútbol players
Villarrubia CF players
UD Tamaraceite footballers
CD Lugo players